Fortaleza de Minas is a Brazilian municipality located in the southwest of the state of Minas Gerais. The city belongs to the meso-region of Sul e Sudoeste de Minas and to the micro-region of Passos. It became a municipality in 1963.

Location
The city center of Fortaleza de Minas is located at an elevation of 856 meters just south of the regional center of Passos.  Neighboring  municipalities are:  Pratápolis (N and NW), Itaú de Minas (N), Passos (NE and E),  Jacuí and Bom Jesus da Penha (S and SE), São Sebastião do Paraíso (W).

Distances
Belo Horizonte:  taking MG-050
Jacuí:   to the south
Passos:  to the north
Ribeirão Preto: 145 km
Brasília: 773 km
São Paulo: 430 km
The nearest airport with national flights is in Ribeirão Preto.

Tourism
Despite the small area there is a lot of variety in the landscape with rugged hills, streams, and waterfalls. There are three modest hotels and four restaurants. The São João River is the main river. It has waterfalls, and large rock formations and is used for the practice of canoeing and kayaking. See Galeria de fotos for photos.

Economic activities
Mining, services, small industries, and agriculture are the main economic activities.  The economy is based on mineral extraction (nickel) and the sulfuric acid industry.  There is one large enterprise, Mineração Serra da Fortaleza, of the Votorantim group.  In 2005 501 workers were employed in this industry.  The GDP in 2005 was approximately R$112 million, with 5 million reais from taxes, 25 million reais from services, 72 million reais from industry, and 9 million reais from agriculture.  There were 521 rural producers on 18,000 hectares of land.  Approximately 1,800 persons were occupied in agriculture.  The main crops are coffee, bananas, sugarcane, rice, beans, and corn.  There were 11,000 head of cattle, of which 3,000 were milk cows (2006).

There is 1 bank (2007) In the vehicle fleet there were 616 automobiles, 48 trucks, 53 pickup trucks, 4 buses, and 212 motorcycles (2007).

Health and education
In the health sector there were 3 health clinics (2005).  Educational needs of 850 students were attended to by 2 primary schools, 1 middle school, and 1 pre-primary school.

Municipal Human Development Index: 0.765 (2000)
State ranking: 191 out of 853 municipalities 
National ranking: 1,458 out of 5,138 municipalities 
Literacy rate: 85%
Life expectancy: 74 (average of males and females)

In 2000 the per capita monthly income of R$192.00 was below the state average of R$276.00 and below the national average of R$297.00.  Poços de Caldas had the highest per capita monthly income in 2000 with R$435.00.  The lowest was Setubinha with R$73.00.

The highest ranking municipality in Minas Gerais in 2000 was Poços de Caldas with 0.841, while the lowest was Setubinha with 0.568.  Nationally the highest was São Caetano do Sul in São Paulo with 0.919, while the lowest was Setubinha.  In more recent statistics (considering 5,507 municipalities) Manari in the state of Pernambuco has the lowest rating in the country—0,467—putting it in last place.

References

See also
 List of municipalities in Minas Gerais

Municipalities in Minas Gerais